Unión Estepona Club de Fútbol was a Spanish football team based in Estepona, in the autonomous community of Andalusia. Founded in 1995 it currently plays in Tercera División – Group 9, holding home matches at Estadio Francisco Muñoz Pérez, with a capacity of 4,500 spectators.

In 2014, the team was dissolved and replaced by CD Estepona FS.

Season to season

2 seasons in Segunda División B
4 seasons in Tercera División

Former players
 Ángel Guirado
  Catanha
 Sam Coverdale
 Jack Curd

References

External links
Official website 
Futbolme team profile 

Football clubs in Andalusia
Association football clubs established in 1995
1995 establishments in Spain
Association football clubs disestablished in 2014
2014 disestablishments in Spain